This Is Not a Comedy is a 2021 Mexican film directed by Rodrigo Guardiola and Gabriel Nuncio, written by Gabriel Nuncio and Alo Valenzuela and starring Gabriel Nuncio, Cassandra Ciangherotti and Adriana Paz.

Cast 
 Gabriel Nuncio
 Cassandra Ciangherotti as Leyre
 Adriana Paz as Melissa
 Cecilia Suárez
 Alejandro Saevich as Saevich
 Eduardo Donjuan as Don Juan (as Eduardo Don Juan)
 Manolo Caro as Lauro
 María Castellá as Magaly
 Carlos Abraham Gongo as Gerardo
 Renata Vaca as Dayana
 Tamara Vallarta as Lily

References

External links
 
 

2020s Spanish-language films
2021 films
Spanish-language Netflix original films
Mexican comedy-drama films
2020s Mexican films